Cyberdillo is a first-person shooter developed by Pixel Technologies and published by Panasonic in 1996. It was released for the 3DO and MS-DOS.

The game received mixed reviews.

Gameplay
Cyberdillo is a first-person shooter in which the player takes the role of the Cyberdillo, an armadillo who was run over by a car and was made into a cyborg. Starting off with a plunger gun, Cyberdillo must collect items such as platform shoes or bellbottoms to progress to the next level.

Enemies the player come across include hairspray and bipedal hotdogs. The player can also collect power-ups like the bone flute, which temporarily causes the screen to go black (a play on the myth about masturbation), and the laxative which will kill you if you're unable to find a toilet in time.

Development
Cyberdillo was developed by Pixel Technologies and published by Panasonic in January 1996.

Reception

Cyberdillo received mixed reviews from video game critics.

A reviewer for GamePro called the gameplay "redundant" and lacking Doom's suspense. The reviewer was also mixed on the game's music. While calling it "tongue-in-cheek" and adding charm to the game, they added that the player's tolerance would depend on their liking of disco. They also described the voice acting as "unintelligible".

Steve Bauman from Computer Games Magazine considered the soundtrack to be the best part of the game, while calling the game mediocre.

Hardcore Gaming 101 criticized the controls for being too slippery and its level designs for being confusing.

Next Generation reviewed the 3DO version of the game, and stated that "Although Cyberdillo moves surprisingly fast on 3DO, the control is very loose and the graphics are far from cutting edge. The developers deserve credit for trying to make something that's different, but in the end, Cyberdillo is either a cute novelty of a run-of-the-mill Doom game – neither of which make for much long-term entertainment."

References

External links 
 Cyberdillo at GameFAQs
 Cyberdillo at Giant Bomb
 Cyberdillo at MobyGames

Fictional armadillos
1996 video games
3DO Interactive Multiplayer games
DOS games
First-person shooters
Single-player video games
Video games about cyborgs
Video games developed in the United States
Video games with 2.5D graphics
Sprite-based first-person shooters